NGC 23 is a spiral galaxy located in the northern constellation of Pegasus, around  distant from the Milky Way. It was discovered by William Herschel on 10 September 1784. In the Webb Society Deep-Sky Observer's Handbook, the visual appearance of NGC 23 is described as follows:
Bright, extended ellipse; a bright nuclear structure is noticeably elongated; two weak spiral enhancements emerge from opposite sides of the nucleus, one curving towards a bright star attached on the south end. The galaxy is likely interacting with NGC 9.

The shape of this galaxy is described by its morphological classification of SBb, which indicates it is a barred spiral (SB) with spiral arms that are moderately tightly wound (b). It is a luminous infrared galaxy with star-forming clumps. In 1959 a candidate supernova was discovered in NGC 23 using the Hale Telescope. It has vanished on a plate taken 60 days later.

References

External links
 
 

Barred spiral galaxies
Luminous infrared galaxies
NGC 0023
0023
00089
000698
Galaxies discovered in 1784
Discoveries by William Herschel